Arthur Knyvett-Lee (6 June 1887 - 1974) was a British art gallery owner, the co-founder of The Redfern Gallery.

Knyvett-Lee was born on 6 June 1887. He was the son of Frederic Hugh Lee, a solicitor, and his wife Florence Lee.

He served in the British Army during the First World War, rising to the rank of captain, with the Somerset Light Infantry.

In 1923, Knyvett-Lee co-founded The Redfern Gallery with Anthony Maxtone Graham on the top floor of Redfern House, 27 Old Bond Street, London, as an artists' cooperative.

He died in 1974.

References

Art dealers from London
Somerset Light Infantry officers
1887 births
1974 deaths
20th-century English businesspeople